Desmond Dickson (born 1948) is a Northern Irish retired footballer who played as an inside forward in the Irish League for Coleraine. He scored prolifically for the club, with 452 goals in 609 appearances. Dickson also managed the club.

Honours 
Coleraine

 Irish League: 1973–74
 Irish Cup: 1971–72, 1974–75, 1976–77
 Top Four Cup: 1968–69
 City Cup: 1968–69
 Gold Cup: 1969, 1975
 Ulster Cup: 1968–69, 1969–70, 1972–73, 1975–76
 Blaxnit Cup: 1968–69, 1969–70
 North West Senior Cup: 1967–68, 1980–81

Individual

 Irish League top goalscorer: 1969–70, 1971–72 (shared), 1972–73, 1973–74, 1975–76, 1980–81 (shared)
 Northern Ireland Football Writers' Association Player of the Year: 1969–70

See also 
 List of men's footballers with 500 or more goals

References 

Association footballers from Northern Ireland
NIFL Premiership players
Association football inside forwards
People from Ballymoney
Coleraine F.C. players
1948 births
Coleraine F.C. managers
Northern Ireland amateur international footballers
Living people
NIFL Premiership managers
Northern Ireland international footballers
Irish League representative players
Football managers from Northern Ireland

External links